Biras is a commune in the Dordogne department in southwestern France.

Population

See also
Communes of the Dordogne département

References

External links

 Biras on the map of France
 https://web.archive.org/web/20070513014059/http://www.cc-brantomois.fr/biras.html

Communes of Dordogne